The 1904 Central Oklahoma Bronchos football team represented Central Normal School during the 1904 college football season. The Central squad finished the season with a record of 2–3.

Schedule

References

Central Oklahoma
Central Oklahoma Bronchos football seasons
Central Oklahoma Football